Kevin Anderson, who was the defending champion, lost to qualifier Ričardas Berankis in the second round.
Michael Russell defeated his compatriot Taylor Dent 7–5, 6–4 in the final match.

Seeds

Draw

Finals

Top half

Bottom half

References
 Main Draw
 Qualifying Draw

JSM Challenger of Champaign-Urbana - Singles
JSM Challenger of Champaign–Urbana